There is no county-wide local education authority in South Yorkshire, instead education services are provided by the four smaller metropolitan boroughs of Barnsley, Doncaster, Rotherham and Sheffield:

List of schools in Barnsley
List of schools in Doncaster
List of schools in Rotherham
List of schools in Sheffield